WNJT-FM (88.1 FM) is a radio station licensed to Trenton, New Jersey. The station is owned by New York Public Radio, and is an affiliate of their New Jersey Public Radio network.

WNYC assumed control of the stations that make up NJPR under a management agreement on July 1, 2011.

External links
  

NJT-FM
Radio stations established in 1991
1991 establishments in New Jersey
NPR member stations
New York Public Radio